This is a list of cricketers who represented their country at the 1979 Cricket World Cup in England which took place from 9 June 1979 to 23 June 1979. The oldest player at the 1979 Cricket World Cup was Garnet Brisbane (40) of Canada while the youngest player was  Sudath Pasqual (17) of Sri Lanka.

Source: Cricinfo 1979 World Cup stats for Australia

Source: Cricinfo 1979 World Cup stats for Canada

Source: Cricinfo 1979 World Cup stats for England

Source: Cricinfo 1979 World Cup stats for India

Source: Cricinfo 1979 World Cup stats for New Zealand

Source: Cricinfo 1979 World Cup stats for Pakistan

Source: Cricinfo 1979 World Cup stats for Sri Lanka

Source: Cricinfo 1979 World Cup stats for West Indies

References

External links
 1979 Cricket World Cup. Cricinfo.com.
 1979 Cricket World Cup Squads . worldcupofcricket.com.

Cricket World Cup squads
Squads, 1979 Cricket World Cup